Garringo (also known as Dead Are Countless) is a 1969 Spanish-Italian Spaghetti Western film written and directed by Rafael Romero Marchent.

Cast

References

External links

1969 films
Spaghetti Western films
Spanish Western (genre) films
1969 Western (genre) films
Films directed by Rafael Romero Marchent
Films scored by Marcello Giombini
Films with screenplays by Rafael Romero Marchent
1960s Italian films